The Satellite Award for Best Supporting Actress in a Series, Miniseries, or Television Film is one of the annual Satellite Awards given by the International Press Academy.

Winners and nominees

1990s

2000s

2010s

2020s

References

External links	
 Official website

Actress - Motion Picture, Supporting
Television awards for Best Supporting Actress